Ralph H. Spanjer (September 20, 1920 – February 8, 1999) was a major general in the United States Marine Corps. He went on to serve as superintendent of the Marine Military Academy in Harlingen, Texas, and president of St. John's Northwestern Military Academy in Delafield, Wisconsin.

Biography
Spanjer was born on September 20, 1920, in Hillside, New Jersey, the youngest of eight children. He would attend New York University. Spanjer would also marry three times and had three children, as well as a stepson. He died of cancer at his home in Delafield, Wisconsin, on February 8, 1999.

Career
After originally joining the United States Navy in 1941, Spanjer joined the United States Marine Corps Reserve in 1942. He went on to serve as a fighter pilot in World War II. During that time, he was awarded the Distinguished Flying Cross for his actions in the Pacific Theater of Operations.

During the Korean War, he flew missions with pilots that included John Glenn, who later became the first American to orbit Earth in space and a U.S. Senator. Spanjer was awarded a second Distinguished Flying Cross for his actions during the war.

Spanjer flew helicopters during the Vietnam War, serving in assault landings and medical evacuations. During the final years of the war, he served in other high-ranking positions. He was twice awarded the Legion of Merit, including one with a Combat Valor device, during his service in the Vietnam War.

He was awarded a third Legion of Merit before retiring from the Marine Corps.

Spanjer served as superintendent of the Marine Military Academy for six years. After stops in North Carolina and Alaska, he accepted the position of president of St. John's Northwestern Military Academy in 1994. During his tenure, he oversaw a $5 million renovation, the merger of the academy with Northwestern Military and Naval Academy in Lake Geneva, Wisconsin, and organized a visit by former U.S. President George H. W. Bush.

Awards and decorations
During his military career he was awarded:

References

1920 births
1999 deaths
United States Marine Corps generals
United States Navy sailors
New York University alumni
United States Marine Corps pilots of World War II
United States Navy personnel of World War II
United States Marine Corps personnel of the Korean War
United States Marine Corps personnel of the Vietnam War
American Korean War pilots
American Vietnam War pilots
Helicopter pilots
Recipients of the Legion of Merit
Recipients of the Distinguished Flying Cross (United States)
Recipients of the Air Medal
People from Hillside, New Jersey
Deaths from cancer in Wisconsin
People from Delafield, Wisconsin
Military personnel from New Jersey
Military personnel from Wisconsin